The Men's FIH Pro League is an international men's field hockey competition organised by the International Hockey Federation (FIH), which replaces the Men's FIH Hockey World League. The competition also serves as a qualifier for the Hockey World Cup and the Olympic Games.

The first edition started in 2019. Nine teams secured their places for four years.

Format

Nine men's and women's teams compete in a round-robin tournament with home and away matches, played from October to June, with the top team at the end of the season winning the league.
From 2021-22 onwards, the bottom team at the end of the season will be relegated and will be replaced by the winner of a new competition called the Men's FIH Nations Cup.

Teams

In July 2017, Hockey India decided to withdraw both the men's and women's national teams from the competition as they estimated the chances of qualifying for the Summer Olympics to be higher when participating in the Men's FIH Hockey World League. Hockey India also cited lack of clarity in the ranking system. The International Hockey Federation subsequently invited Spain instead. Pakistan were suspended on 23 January 2019 after they could not play their first three games. India joined the Pro League from 2020 onwards. On 17 September 2021, both, New Zealand and Australia, withdrew from the 2021–22 season due to the COVID-19 pandemic and the travel restrictions coming with it.

Current teams

Former teams
 (suspended in 2019)
 (competed in the 2021-22 season)
 (competed in the 2021-22 season)

Results

2019

2020–present

Summary

Team appearances

See also
Women's FIH Pro League
Hockey Series
Men's FIH Hockey World League
Men's FIH Hockey Nations Cup

Notes

References

 
FIH Pro League
FIH Pro League Men